Workmen's Compensation (Occupational Diseases) Convention (Revised), 1934 is  an International Labour Organization Convention.

It was established in 1934:
Having decided upon the adoption of certain proposals with regard to the partial revision of the Convention concerning workmen's compensation for occupational diseases adopted by the Conference at its Seventh Session,...

Modification 
The convention revised Convention C18 and was subsequently revised in 1964 by Convention C121.

Ratifications and denunciations
As of 2013, the convention has been ratified by 53 states. Subsequently, the convention has been automatically denounced by 13 states by reason of their acceptance of the revising convention.

External links 
Text.
Ratifications.

Workmen's
Occupational safety and health treaties
Treaties concluded in 1934
Treaties entered into force in 1936
Treaties of Algeria
Treaties of Argentina
Treaties of Australia
Treaties of the First Austrian Republic
Treaties of the Bahamas
Treaties of Barbados
Treaties of Belize
Treaties of Vargas-era Brazil
Treaties of the People's Republic of Bulgaria
Treaties of Burundi
Treaties of the Comoros
Treaties of Cuba
Treaties of Czechoslovakia
Treaties of the Czech Republic
Treaties of Denmark
Treaties of the French Fourth Republic
Treaties of the Kingdom of Greece
Treaties of Guyana
Treaties of Haiti
Treaties of Honduras
Treaties of the Kingdom of Hungary (1920–1946)
Treaties of India
Treaties of the Kingdom of Iraq
Treaties of Italy
Treaties of Malta
Treaties of Mauritius
Treaties of Mexico
Treaties of Morocco
Treaties of Myanmar
Treaties of New Zealand
Treaties of Norway
Treaties of Papua New Guinea
Treaties of Panama
Treaties of the Polish People's Republic
Treaties of Rwanda
Treaties of Slovakia
Treaties of the Solomon Islands
Treaties of the Union of South Africa
Treaties of Francoist Spain
Treaties of Suriname
Treaties of Turkey
Treaties of the United Kingdom
Treaties extended to the Nauru Trust Territory
Treaties extended to the Territory of Papua and New Guinea
Treaties extended to the Belgian Congo
Treaties extended to Ruanda-Urundi
Treaties extended to French Guiana
Treaties extended to French Polynesia
Treaties extended to Guadeloupe
Treaties extended to Martinique
Treaties extended to New Caledonia
Treaties extended to Réunion
Treaties extended to Saint Pierre and Miquelon
Treaties extended to the Trust Territory of Somalia
Treaties extended to Saint Christopher-Nevis-Anguilla
Treaties extended to the Colony of the Bahamas
Treaties extended to the Colony of Barbados
Treaties extended to Bermuda
Treaties extended to the Bechuanaland Protectorate
Treaties extended to Brunei (protectorate)
Treaties extended to the Falkland Islands
Treaties extended to the Colony of Fiji
Treaties extended to Gibraltar
Treaties extended to Guernsey
Treaties extended to British Guiana
Treaties extended to Jersey
Treaties extended to the Gilbert and Ellice Islands
Treaties extended to Basutoland
Treaties extended to the Isle of Man
Treaties extended to Montserrat
Treaties extended to British Saint Lucia
Treaties extended to the British Solomon Islands
Treaties extended to Swaziland (protectorate)
Treaties extended to Surinam (Dutch colony)
Treaties extended to Curaçao and Dependencies
Treaties extended to British Hong Kong
1934 in labor relations